Palpita subillustrata is a moth in the family Crambidae. It was described by Inoue in 1997. It is found in the Philippines (Palawan).

References

Moths described in 1997
Palpita
Moths of Asia